Yagli-El (Yaglī-ʼel - the god has shown himself or the god revealed) was a king from Dilmun who was ruling around 1700 BC. Yagli-El is known from four cuneiform inscriptions that were placed on steatite vessels. Three of these vessels were found in a big tomb on Bahrain. It is most likely that this tomb was his burial place. All inscriptions bear the same text: Palace of Yagli-El, the servant on Inzak of Akkarum. In one of the inscriptions also Yagli-El's father Riʼmum is mentioned, who was then his predecessor.

The inscriptions do not call Yagli-El king, but the big size of the burial place leaves little doubt about it. A king (lugal) of Dilmun is mentioned in cuneiform texts. The name Yagli-El is Amoritic showing that Amorites lived on Bahrain. The style of the cuneiform signs dates this king around 1700 BC.

References 

Amorite kings
Dilmun
17th-century BC people